The lake of fire is a religious after-death concept.

Lake of Fire may also refer to:

Lake of Fire (album), a 2006 album by Shaye
Lake of Fire (film), a 2006 documentary film about abortion
""Lake of Fire" (song), a song by the Meat Puppets and covered by Nirvana
"Lake of Fire", a song by Boondox from his 2006 album The Harvest